Rendan or Rindan may refer to:

Randan, Tehran